Ludmila Mikhailovna Savelyeva (born January 24, 1942, in Leningrad) is a Soviet and Russian stage and film actress. She achieved lasting fame in the role of Natasha Rostova in the 1966–68 film War and Peace, which was six years in the making, and gained an Academy Award in the United States, making her the first Russian actress ever who won an Oscar. She won a Diploma prize for the role at the 4th Moscow International Film Festival.

Filmography

References

External links

 

1942 births
20th-century Russian actresses
21st-century Russian actresses
Living people
Academicians of the National Academy of Motion Picture Arts and Sciences of Russia
Honored Artists of the RSFSR
People's Artists of the RSFSR
Recipients of the Order of the Red Banner of Labour
Russian film actresses
Russian stage actresses
Soviet film actresses

Soviet stage actresses